Lars Fredrik Beckstrøm (born January 22, 1960 in Oslo) is a Norwegian musician who is mostly known for playing bass in the Norwegian rock band deLillos, but has also recorded several albums under the name Beckstrøm. He has written many of the band's well known songs such as "Nittenåttifire" and "Balladen om Kåre og Nelly", which he on albums and concerts sings himself. As a solo artist "Svigermor" from 1997 is his biggest hit.

He is also a member of Dog Age and "The Humble Servants".

Discography
Tett i tett (1992)
Lykkens kalosjer (1997)
Helium (2003)
Drøm videre! (2006)
Døgenikt (2008)

References 

1960 births
Living people
Norwegian musicians
Scandinavian musicians
Norwegian bass guitarists
Norwegian male bass guitarists
Musicians from Oslo
Norwegian multi-instrumentalists